S. Rajaraman is an Indian politician and former Member of the Legislative Assembly of Tamil Nadu.

References 

Indian National Congress politicians from Tamil Nadu
Living people
Year of birth missing (living people)
Tamil Nadu MLAs 1985–1989
Tamil Nadu MLAs 1991–1996